Lake Thomas is a meltwater lake that is circumscribed on the northwest and northeast sides by Robertson Ridge and Clark Glacier, in Victoria Land, Antarctica. It was named by the Advisory Committee on Antarctic Names for Robert H. Thomas who participated in United States Antarctic Research Program studies of the surface glaciology of the Ross Ice Shelf in the 1973–74 and 1974–75 seasons.

References

Lakes of Antarctica
Scott Coast